Willie Thomas (born February 13, 1931) was an American jazz trumpeter, author and educator.

Biography

Willie Thomas was raised in Orlando, Florida and started playing the trumpet around the age of 10.

In the 1950s, Willie was a member of the Third Army Band, where he met and played with pianist Wynton Kelly, which became his first real break into the New York jazz scene.

In his 45 years as a jazz trumpeter, Thomas has performed or recorded with many jazz greats including the MJT+3 with Frank Strozier and Bob Cranshaw, the Slide Hampton Octet with Freddie Hubbard and George Coleman, the Woody Herman Orchestra, the Al Belletto Sextet, and singer Peggy Lee.

Thomas created the series of jazz educational books Jazz Anyone...?. He has also an active member of the International Association for Jazz Education and was inducted into the International Association of Jazz Educators' Jazz Education Hall of Fame in 1994.

Personal life
Willie married American jazz singer Jerri Winters.

Selected discography

As leader

 Discover Jazz - Live! At The 1982 NAJE Convention (1982, Mark) - with Bunky Green, and featuring Nick Brignola, Frank Pazzullo, Larry Green (bassist), Arch Martin, and Warrick Carter
 In Love Again (1987, Mark) - with Bunky Green

As sideman 

With Woody Herman and Tito Puente
 Herman's Heat & Puente's Beat (1958, Everest)

With Slide Hampton
 Sister Salvation / Somethin' Sanctified / Live at Birdland (1960, 1961, Atlantic Records/Fresh Sound)
 Two Sides of Slide (1961, Charlie Parker Records) (as William Thomas)
 Jazz with a Twist (1962, Atlantic Records)With MJT+3 MJT+3 (Vee-Jay Records) with Frank Strozier, Harold Mabern, Bob Cranshaw, and Walter Perkins 
 Make Everybody Happy (1961, Vee-Jay Records)With Peggy Lee Basin Street East Proudly Presents Miss Peggy Lee (1961, Capitol Records)With Bill Henderson His complete Vee-Jay Recordings Vol. 1 (1993, Vee-Jay Records/Koch Jazz)With Bill Barron' West Side Story Bossa Nova (1963, Dauntless)

Books

The Jazz Anyone.....? series, published by Alfred Music:Jazz Anyone.....?, Bk 1: Play and Learn (B Flat Tenor Sax Edition) Jazz Anyone.....?, Bk 1: Play and Learn (E-Flat Instruments) (Book & 2 CDs) Jazz Anyone.....?, Bk 1: Play and Learn (Teacher Edition) (Book & 3 CDs) Jazz Anyone.....?, Vol 1: Play and Learn Jazz Combo Collection (Easy)Jazz Anyone.....?, Bk 2: Play and Learn Blues and More (Bass Edition) (Book & 2 CDs)Jazz Anyone.....?, Bk 2: Play and Learn Blues and More (Teacher Edition) (Book & 2 CDs)Jazz Anyone.....?, Bk 3: Making Music -- A Simple Language System for Jazz (Teacher Edition) (Book & 2 CDs)Jazz Anyone.....?, Bk 3: Making Music -- A Simple Language System for Jazz (E-Flat Instruments) (Book & 2 CDs)Jazz Anyone.....? Rhythm ManualFuntime Blues Pack (Student's Book) (A Jazz Curriculum for K-6)''

References

American jazz trumpeters
American male trumpeters
Hard bop trumpeters
1931 births
Bebop trumpeters
20th-century American musicians
20th-century trumpeters
21st-century trumpeters
Living people
21st-century American musicians
Jazz musicians from Florida
Musicians from Orlando, Florida
20th-century American male musicians
21st-century American male musicians
American male jazz musicians